The 1943 Palestine Wartime Cup (HaGavia HaMilhamti) was a special edition of the Palestine Cup, declared to be separate from the main Palestine Cup competition with its own trophy However, the IFA recognize the title as part of the main competition.

The competition was split into four regional competitions, with the four regional winners competing in the final phase. The Royal Artillery XI from Haifa, nicknamed The Gunners won the competition, defeating Hapoel Jerusalem 7–1 in the final.

First Phase

Haifa region

Samaria region

Jerusalem region

South region

Semi-finals

Final

Notes

References
100 Years of Football 1906-2006, Elisha Shohat (Israel), 2006

Israel State Cup
Cup
Cup
Israel State Cup seasons